Clara Elizabeth Laughlin (August 3, 1873March 3, 1941) was an American writer, editor and radio personality. She was born in New York City and lived in Chicago.

Biography
Clara Elizabeth Laughlin was born on August 3, 1873, in New York City. She graduated from North Division High School in 1890. She wrote more than 35 books. These included biographies of Sarah Bernhardt, Ferdinand Foch, and James Whitcomb Riley, in addition to an autobiography and several novels. She wrote articles for the Ladies Home Journal, and a series of travel books called "So you're going to."

Laughlin also headed Clara E. Laughlin's Travel Service, which had offices in Chicago, Los Angeles, New York, and Paris, and she published a monthly magazine with circulation of more than 80,000. For three years, she gave travelogues on a radio station in Chicago.

Laughlin died on March 3, 1941, in Chicago.

Papers
Laughlin's papers are held by Smith College and were donated by her nieces.

References

External links
 
 
 
 Clara E. Laughlin papers at the Sophia Smith Collection, Smith College Special Collections

1873 births
1941 deaths
American biographers
Writers from Chicago
Writers from New York City
American radio actresses
American women biographers
Historians from New York (state)
Historians from Illinois